Ross Gregory Douthat (born 1979) is an American political analyst, blogger, author and New York Times columnist. He was a senior editor of The Atlantic. He has written on a variety of topics, including the state of Christianity in America and "sustainable decadence" in contemporary society.

Personal life
Ross Gregory Douthat was born in 1979 in San Francisco, California, and grew up in New Haven, Connecticut. As an adolescent, Douthat converted to Pentecostalism and then, with the rest of his family, to Catholicism.

His mother is a writer. His great-grandfather was the poet and Governor Charles Wilbert Snow of Connecticut. His father, Charles Douthat, is a partner in a New Haven law firm and a poet. In 2007, Douthat married Abigail Tucker, a reporter for The Baltimore Sun and a writer for Smithsonian. He and his family live in New Haven, Connecticut.

Douthat has written that he suffers from chronic Lyme disease, a diagnosis that is unrecognized by mainstream medicine. His symptoms began in 2015, soon after he and his family had moved to Connecticut. This is the subject of his book The Deep Places.

Education

Douthat attended Hamden Hall, a private high school in Hamden, Connecticut. Douthat graduated magna cum laude with a Bachelor of Arts from Harvard University in 2002, where he was also elected to Phi Beta Kappa. While there he contributed to The Harvard Crimson and edited The Harvard Salient.

Career

Douthat is a regular columnist for The New York Times. In April 2009, he became the youngest regular op-ed writer in The New York Times after replacing Bill Kristol as a conservative voice on the Times editorial page.

Before joining The New York Times, he was a senior editor at The Atlantic. He has published books on the decline of religion in American society, the role of Harvard University in creating an American ruling class and other topics related to religion, politics and society. His book Grand New Party (2008), which he co-wrote with Reihan Salam, was described by New York Times commentator David Brooks as the "best single roadmap of where the Republican Party should and is likely to head." Douthat's The Decadent Society: How We Became the Victims of Our Own Success (2020) received positive reviews in The New York Times and National Review. Douthat frequently appeared on the video debate site Bloggingheads.tv until 2012.

Douthat has written in support of banning abortion, arguing that science shows that a zygote (a fertilized egg) is a distinct human and that destroying it would be to kill a human.

Published works
 
 Grand New Party: How Republicans Can Win the Working Class and Save the American Dream. With Salam, Reihan. New York: Doubleday. 2008. .
  Description.
  2019 pbk reprint
The Decadent Society: How We Became the Victims of Our Own Success.  Avid Reader Press / Simon & Schuster, 2020. (The paperback edition, issued in 2021, is titled: The Decadent Society: America Before and After the Pandemic.) 
The Deep Places: A Memoir of Illness and Discovery. Convergent Books. October 26, 2021.

Notes

References

External links

 Douthat's columns, The New York Times
 Douthat's former blog, The Atlantic
 Archive of Douthat's columns, The Harvard Crimson
 Video discussions and debates featuring Douthat, Bloggingheads.tv
 
 "They're Young, They're Bright, They Tilt to the Right" A conversation with Ross Douthat and Reihan Salam from n+1

1979 births
21st-century American memoirists
American bloggers
American film critics
American magazine editors
American male bloggers
American political writers
The Atlantic (magazine) people
Catholics from Connecticut
Converts to Pentecostal denominations
Converts to Roman Catholicism from Evangelicalism
Critics of atheism
Hamden Hall Country Day School alumni
Harvard College alumni
The Harvard Crimson people
Journalists from Washington, D.C.
Living people
National Review people
Roman Catholic writers
The New York Times columnists
Writers from New Haven, Connecticut
Writers from San Francisco